The Reformed Presbyterian Church in Japan was founded in 1950 by the Presbyterian Church (USA). The church started the work in Kobe. The church was part of the Presbyterian church in the United States, but gained independence since then. It has 7 congregations and affirms the Westminster Confession, Westminster Larger Catechism and Westminster Shorter Catechism.

References 

Presbyterian denominations in Asia
Reformed denominations in Japan